Ammara Noman is a Pakistani chef who rose to prominence after winning the title of first MasterChef Pakistan. She beat about 100 contestants and her 15 co-contestants who entered the Masterchef Kitchen.

Personal info
Ammara Noman was born to Muslim parents in 1981 in peshawar, khyber pakhtunkhwa, Pakistan. She is married to Noman sheikh, couple have four children. She was married at a very young age and only has High school diploma.

MasterChef Paskitan: 2014 

Despite no training in cooking and special achievements, Ammara is a self skilled and a gifted cook. She is an ardent follower of the MasterChef counterparts across the globe. She states: "That every time I watched the shows i could picture myself standing in the MasterChef kitchen at my own cooking station".

She auditioned in Karachi and was selected after presenting her cold dish in Live cooking challenge. Subsequently, passing Boot Camp challenges, she appears as a 'Top 16'. In the 25 episodes where she competed in first series, Ammara was the first person who won Immunity and won eight times in individual and team challenges; additionally, she placed six times in the top three group. Ammara was the only contestant who never faced any elimination challenge: Either she won the challenge or simply got selected for next stage.

On July 27, 2014, Ammara was announced the winner of the competition and took away PKR 5,000,000, (US $ 50,000) the MasterChef title, the MasterChef trophy, and a cookbook deal, including five years free supply of Ariel. Ammara will soon publish her cookbook.

References

External links
 
 Ammara Noman on Urdu1
 Video MasterChef Pakistan - Season 1 Episode 26 - Final Winner !, on July 27, 2014

People from Karachi
Living people
1981 births
Muhajir people
Reality cooking competition winners
MasterChef Pakistan
Pakistani television chefs
Participants in Pakistani reality television series
Women chefs